The Royal Library of Belgium (abbreviated KBR and sometimes nicknamed  in French or  in Dutch) is the national library of Belgium. The library has a history that goes back to the age of the Dukes of Burgundy. In the second half of the 20th century, a new building was constructed on the Mont des Arts/Kunstberg in central Brussels, near the Central Station. The library owns several collections of historical importance, like Library of the Dukes of Burgundy, and is the depository for all books ever published in Belgium or abroad by Belgian authors.

There are four million bound volumes in the Royal Library, including a rare book collection numbering 45,000 works. The library has more than 750,000 prints, drawings and photographs, 150,000 maps and plans, and more than 250,000 objects, from coins to scales to monetary weights. This coin collection holds one of the most valuable coins in the field of numismatics, a fifth-century Sicilian tetradrachm. The library also houses the Center for American Studies, a rich American Studies collection of 30,000 books in open stacks, as well as U.S. newspapers and databases.

The Royal Library is open for reference only. Patrons must be at least eighteen years of age and must pay an annual membership fee.

Collection 

With more than 6 million books (more than 150 kilometres of bookshelves), the Royal Library of Belgium is the biggest library in the country. It contains:
4,000,000 books
21,500 magazines
150,000 maps
32,000 manuscripts
300,000 ancient printed materials
750,000 prints, drawings and photographs
9,200 microfilms
50,000 long playing records

The library has 6 “special” divisions, namely the Coins & Medals, Manuscripts & Rare Books, Maps & Plans, Music, Newspapers & Contemporary Media, and Prints & Drawings Departments. The initial basis of the collections were the library of Charles van Hulthem, acquired in 1837, and the library of the City of Brussels, acquired in 1842, which had come to include large parts of the former Royal Library of the Low Countries (founded 1559).

Prints & Drawings Department

KBR's print room holds the largest collection of prints and drawings in the country. With more than 750,000 works on paper, the collection is among the ten greatest print rooms in the world (List of museums with major collections of European prints and drawings). Its exhaustive collection of Northern European prints is particularly esteemed and includes work by major printmakers, such as Albrecht Dürer, Pieter Bruegel the Elder, Anthony van Dyck and Rembrandt. Among its large collection of drawings are highlights by major Netherlandish artists such as Pieter Bruegel the Elder, Joris Hoefnagel, Hendrick Goltzius, Peter Paul Rubens and Jacob Jordaens. The Department also includes important work by Belgian artists, most notably among them Félicien Rops, Fernand Khnopff, James Ensor, Léon Spilliaert and Rik Wouters. Furthermore, the KBR print room has a significant ensemble of Japanese ukiyo-e, including the single copy of Sharaku's Actor Iwai Hanshirō IV in the role of Otoma, and Congolese watercolours from the first half of the 20th century. In addition to the Old Master and Modern prints and drawings, the collection boasts large ensembles of topographical views, portrait prints, documentary photography, posters, postcards and other printed ephemera, including but not limited to ex-libris, playing cards, wallpaper, lottery tickets and catchpenny prints.

KBR's chalcography, established in 1932 as an independent division, is nowadays part of the print room. The chalcography is a workshop where the art of printmaking is practiced as well as a division that collects historical printing matrices, such as copper plates and wood blocks. Together with the chalcographies of the Musée du Louvre in Paris, the Real Academia de Bellas Artes de San Fernando in Madrid and the Istituto Nazionale per la Grafica in Rome, this is one of the four surviving national chalcographies in the world. The chalcotheque in Brussels currently has more than 9,000 printing matrices from the 15th century to the present day. Among the highlights is the original copper plate of Claude Mellan's Face of Christ (1649), famously engraved in a single spiral movement.

Music Department

KBR's Music Deparment is considered one of Belgium's most important centers for the preservation and study of music-related documents. The Music Department maintains a rich and varied collection composed of hundreds of thousands of manuscript and printed scores, about 100,000 sound recordings, a large collection of correspondence, printed works, concert programmes, posters, photographs and other iconographic documents, not to mention varied objects such as medals, busts, casts, music instruments. The most representative pieces are part of collections of François-Joseph Fétis, Eugène Ysaÿe, Henri Vieuxtemps, Marc Danval, Yves Becko, Denijs Dille, Flor Peeters or also Edgar Tinel. Although most music-related documents in the Royal Library are held in the Music Department, certain additional works are held in the Manuscripts & Rare Books and Prints & Drawings Departments of KBR.

The Music Division was founded in 1965, building upon the more than 5,000 printed and manuscript documents that made up the private collection of the important 19th century Belgian musicologist François-Joseph Fétis, acquired by the Royal Library in 1872. This Fétis Collection is an important source for the study of early music, and holds a number of important documents such as the autograph manuscript of Johann Sebastian Bach's BWV 995 – Suite in G minor. Among the oldest pieces of the Fétis Collection are several late 15th century manuscripts by theorist Johannes Tinctoris.

The Music Division maintains an active policy of acquisitions through donations and purchase of documents linked with Belgian musical figures such as André-Ernest-Modeste Grétry, Henri Vieuxtemps, César Franck, Eugène Ysaÿe and Guillaume Lekeu, not to mention other European figures such as Albert Roussel, Darius Milhaud, Franz Liszt, Béla Bartók and Edvard Grieg. More recently, the purchase of the Marc Danval and Eric Mathot collections enriched the Music Division's collections with tens of thousands recordings and scores of jazz, salon and other popular music from Belgium and abroad.

Through legal deposit, the Music Division also acquires a considerable number of musicological works and scores printed in Belgium. The Music Division assumes an active role within various international associations, notably IAML, RILM and RISM.

The non-profit organization Archives Béla Bartók de Belgique was created in 2002 and has its headquarters in the Music Division.

KBR Museum

KBR Museum, opened in 2020, is a museum in and around the restored Nassau Chapel of the Royal Library of Belgium.

The display is dedicated to an extensive collection of manuscripts from the Burgundian era (the so-called Bibliothèque des ducs de Bourgogne or Librije van Bourgondië). In addition to the original manuscripts of the Burgundian dukes, paintings, retables, sculptures, weapons and everyday objects from major museums are on display to provide the historical context of the manuscripts. Among the top exhibits are the Chroniques de Hainaut, commissioned by Philip the Good with a commissioned miniature by Rogier van der Weyden.

Librarium

Librarium is a permanent exhibition dedicated to the history of books. The Librarium consists of 6 halls each shedding a different light on carriers of writing. In the first hall the book emergence is introduced. The whole room is dedicated to show the relation between word and image.  The collection material is changed every three months. Moreover, the exhibition shows furnished rooms of Henry van de Velde, Michel de Ghelderode and Émile Verhaeren.

Directors
 1837–1850: Frédéric de Reiffenberg
 1850–1887: Louis-Joseph Alvin
 1887–1904: Edouard Fétis
 1904–1909: Henri Hymans
 1909–1912: Joseph Van den Gheyn, S.J.
 1912–1914: Dom Ursmer Berlière O.S.B.
 1919–1929: Louis Paris
 1929–1943: Victor Tourneur
 1944–1953: Frédéric Lyna
 1953–1955: Marcel Hoc
 1956–1973: Herman Liebaers
 1973–1990: 
 1990–1991: Denise De Weerdt                      
 1992: Josiane Roelants-Abraham
 1992–2002: Pierre Cockshaw
 2002–2005: Raphaël De Smedt                     
 2005–2017: Patrick Lefèvre
 2017–present: Sara Lammens

Nazi looting
In 2020 La Buveuse d'Absinthe by Belgian painter Félicien Rops, which was looted by the Nazis from the Jewish art collector and lawyer Arthur Dorville, was found to be in possession of the Royal Library of Belgium.

See also
List of libraries in Belgium
Academia Belgica
Belgian Federal Science Policy Office (BELSPO)
Brussels Coin Cabinet
Center for Historical Research and Documentation on War and Contemporary Society
National and Provincial State Archives
National Library of the Netherlands

References

External links
 
  
 Official Website of the Center for American Studies 
 Floorplan of the Library

 
Libraries in Belgium
Belgium
Buildings and structures in Brussels
Academic libraries in Belgium
Government buildings in Belgium
1837 establishments in Belgium
Libraries established in 1837